The Camel 12 Hours of Sebring, was the third round of the 1993 IMSA GT Championship and was held at the Sebring International Raceway, on March 20, 1993. Victory overall went to the No. 99 All American Racers Eagle MkIII driven by Juan Manuel Fangio II and Andy Wallace.

Race results
Class winners in bold.

Class Winners

References

IMSA GTP
12 Hours of Sebring
12 Hours of Sebring
Sebring
12 Hours of Sebring